The 1935–36 season was the 63rd season of competitive football in Scotland and the 46th season of the Scottish Football League.

Scottish League Division One 

Champions: Celtic
Relegated: Airdrie, Ayr United

Scottish League Division Two 

Promoted: Falkirk, St Mirren

Scottish Cup 

Rangers were winners of the Scottish Cup for the third time in a row after a 1–0 final win over Third Lanark.

Other honours

National

County 

 * – aggregate over two legs
 # – replay

Highland League

Junior Cup 
Benburb were winners of the Junior Cup after a 1–0 win over Yoker Athletic in the final replay.

Scotland national team 

Scotland was winner of the 1935–36 British Home Championship.

Key:
 (H) = Home match
 (A) = Away match
 BHC = British Home Championship

Notes and references

External links 
 Scottish Football Historical Archive

 
Seasons in Scottish football